Harbour Lights or Harbor Lights may refer to:

Film 
 The Harbour Lights (1914 film), a British silent film adaptation directed by Percy Nash
 The Harbour Lights (1923 film), a British silent film adaptation directed by Tom Terriss
 Harbour Lights, a 1960 animated film by Raoul Servais 
 Harbor Lights (1963 film), a 1963 second feature directed by Maury Dexter

Music 
 "Harbour Lights" (song), a 1937 song by Hugh Williams (pseudonym for Will Grosz) with lyrics by Jimmy Kennedy
 Harbor Lights (album), a 1993 ten-track musical album by Bruce Hornsby
 Harbor Lights (Cristy Lane album), a 1985 album by Cristy Lane
 "Harbor Lights", a track from the 1976 Boz Scaggs' album Silk Degrees
 "Harbour Lights", a track from the 2012 A Silent Film album Sand & Snow

Television 
 Harbour Lights (TV series), a British television drama about a harbourmaster, produced by the BBC and Valentine Productions from 1999 to 2000

Theatre 
 The Harbour Lights, a Victorian play by George R. Sims and Henry Pettitt